Stalag IV-E Altenburg  was a World War II German Army prisoner-of-war camp located near Altenburg in the state  of Thuringia,  south of Leipzig.

Camp history
The camp was opened in June 1940 to hold French prisoners from the Battle of France. Most of the prisoners were sent to Arbeitskommando ("Work Camps"). During Easter 1942 the orchestra and choir performed a "Mass of Consolation and Hope" composed by Jean Lashermes while prisoner in the camp. On 1 June 1942 it was renamed Stalag 384. In October 1944, several hundred women soldiers of the Polish Home Army were transferred to Altenburg from Stalag IV-B and were assigned to various Kommandos in the area. In mid-April 1945 the camp was liberated by units of the 76th Infantry Division, US 7th Army.

Notable inmates
 Jean Lashermes (1901–1972) – French composer.

See also
 List of prisoner-of-war camps in Germany

References

World War II prisoner of war camps in Germany